Invermay Park is a suburb on the Northern rural fringe of the City of Ballarat municipality in Victoria, Australia. Invermay Park contains the Ballarat General Cemetery.

References

Suburbs of Ballarat